Louis Joseph Capozzoli (March 6, 1901 – October 8, 1982) was an American lawyer and politician who served two terms as a United States representative from New York from 1941 to 1945.

Biography 
Born in Cosenza, Italy, he emigrated to the United States in 1906 and attended public schools in New York City. In 1922 he graduated from the law department of Fordham University and in 1923 was admitted to the bar, commencing practice in New York City. He was an assistant district attorney of New York County from 1930 to 1937; and a member of the New York State Assembly (New York Co., 2nd D.) in 1939 and 1940.

Congress 
Capozzoli was elected as a Democrat to the 77th and 78th United States Congresses, holding office from January 3, 1941, to January 3, 1945.

Later career 
Afterwards, he resumed the practice of law.

In 1946, he was elected a justice of the New York City Court and served from 1947 to 1950. He was elected to the Court of General Sessions in 1950, and served until January 1957; he was then appointed and served as a judge of the New York Supreme Court from January 21, 1957, to December 31, 1957. He was elected to the New York Supreme Court for a fourteen-year term and was appointed as an associate justice of the Appellate Division (1st Dept.) on April 29, 1966.

Retirement and death 
He retired from the bench at the end of 1977.

He died on October 8, 1982, in New York City.

References

 Alfred E. Clark, New York Times, Louis J. Capozzoli, Retired Judge, October 9, 1982
 New York State Supreme Court, Appellate Division, First Judicial Department, Biography, Louis J. Capozzoli, retrieved September 26, 2013
 Louis J. Capozzoli at The Political Graveyard, retrieved September 26, 2013

1901 births
1982 deaths
People from Cosenza
Italian emigrants to the United States
Fordham University School of Law alumni
Democratic Party members of the New York State Assembly
New York Supreme Court Justices
Democratic Party members of the United States House of Representatives from New York (state)
20th-century American politicians
20th-century American judges
American people of Italian descent
People of Calabrian descent